Upper Saloum is one of the ten districts of the Central River Division of the Gambia. In the 2013 census, it had a population of 19,145.

References 

Central River Division
Districts of the Gambia